Hinterland is a German word meaning "the land behind" (a city, a port, or similar). Its use in English was first documented by the geographer George Chisholm in his Handbook of Commercial Geography (1888). Originally the term was associated with the area of a port in which materials for export and import are stored and shipped. Subsequently, the use of the word expanded to include any area under the influence of a particular human settlement.

Geographic region 
 An area behind a coast or the shoreline of a river. Specifically, by the doctrine of the hinterland, the hinterland is the inland region lying behind a port and is claimed by the state that owns the coast.
 In shipping usage, a port's hinterland is the area that it serves, both for imports and for exports.
 The term is also used to refer to the area around a city or town.
 More generally, hinterland can refer to the rural area economically tied to an urban catchment area. The size of a hinterland can depend on geography, or on the ease, speed, and cost of transportation between the catchment area and the hinterland.
 In colonial usage, the term was applied to the surrounding areas of former European colonies in Africa, which, although not part of the colony itself, were influenced by the colony. By analogous general economic usage, hinterland can refer to the area surrounding a service from which customers are attracted, also called the market area.
 In German, Hinterland is sometimes used more generally to describe any sparsely populated area where the infrastructure is underdeveloped, although Provinz (analogous to province) is more common. In the United States, and particularly in the American Midwest (a region of German cultural heritage located far from ocean ports), it is this meaning and not the one relating to ports that predominates in common use. Analogous terms include "the countryside", "the sticks", "the boonies", backcountry, boondocks, the Bush (in Alaskan usage), and the outback (in Australian usage).
 In Italy, hinterland is used to describe the metropolitan area of a city, especially Milan, outside of the main municipality.

Breadth of knowledge 
A further sense in which the term is commonly applied, especially by British politicians, is in talking about an individual's depth and breadth of knowledge (or lack thereof), of matters outside politics, specifically of academic, artistic, cultural, literary and scientific pursuits. For instance, one could say, "X has a vast hinterland", or "Y has no hinterland". The spread of this usage is usually credited to Denis Healey (British Defence Secretary 1964–1970, Chancellor of the Exchequer 1974–1979) and his wife Edna Healey, initially in the context of the supposed lack of hinterland—i.e., interests outside of politics—of former Prime Minister Margaret Thatcher.

References 

Geography terminology
German words and phrases